Rapp or RAPP may refer to:

 Rapp (surname)
Rapp, West Virginia
 HNoMS Rapp, the name of several Norwegian navy ships
 Russian Association of Proletarian Writers
 Fort Rapp, a fort in France
 Rapp Motorenwerke, early 20th-century German aircraft engine manufacturer and predecessor to BMW